Alexei Avtonomov may refer to:

 Alexei Ivanovich Avtonomov (1890–1919), Russian Red military commander
 Alexei Stanislavovich Avtonomov (born 1959), Russian legal scholar